The Cretan revolt of 1866–1869 or Great Cretan Revolution was a three-year uprising in Crete against Ottoman rule, the third and largest in a series of Cretan revolts between the end of the Greek War of Independence in 1830 and the establishment of the independent Cretan State in 1898.

Background

The Christian Cretans had risen up together with the rest of Greece in the Greek Revolution of 1821, but despite successes in the countryside, the Ottomans held out in the four fortified towns of the northern coast (Chania, Rethymno, Irakleio and Agios Nikolaos) and the island was eventually reconquered by 1828, becoming an Egyptian province (Muhammad Ali's Egypt, though nominally a vassal of the Ottoman Empire, was a regional power in its own right). In 1840, Crete was returned to direct Ottoman rule, followed by an unsuccessful 1841 uprising in support of Union with independent Greece. Another uprising in 1858 secured some privileges, such as the right to bear arms, equality of Christian and Muslim worship, and the establishment of Christian councils of elders with jurisdiction over education and customary and family law. These concessions were resented by the Cretan Muslims, though Christians pressed for more, while maintaining their ultimate aim of union with Greece.

Revolt

As tensions ran high in the island, and several petitions to the Sultan went unanswered, armed bands were formed, and the uprising was officially proclaimed on 21 August 1866. The revolt caused immediate sympathy in Greece, but also elsewhere in Europe. The rebels initially managed to gain control of most of the hinterland although as always the four fortified towns of the north coast and the southern town of Ierapetra remained in Ottoman hands.

By the mid-19th century, the Ottomans had ruled Crete for more than 220 years since Crete had been captured from Venetians, despite frequent bloody uprisings by Cretan rebels. While the Cretans rose against the Ottoman occupation during the War of Greek Independence, the London Protocol of 1830 dictated that the island could not be a part of the new Greek state.

On 30 March 1856, the Treaty of Paris obligated the Sultan to apply the Hatti-Houmayoun, which guaranteed civil and religious equality to Christians and Muslims. The Ottoman authorities in Crete were reluctant to implement any reform. Before the majority of Muslim conversions (the majority of the former Christians had converted to Islam and then recanted), the Empire tried to recant on liberty of conscience. The institution of new taxes and a curfew also added to the discontent. In April 1858,  Cretans met at Boutsounaria. Finally an imperial decree on 7 July 1858 guaranteed them privileges in religious, judicial and financial matters. One of the major motivations of the revolt of 1866 was the breach of the Hatti-Houmayoun.

A second cause of the insurrection of 1866 was the interference of Hekim Ismail Pasha, wāli of Crete, in an internal quarrel about the organization of the Cretan monasteries. Several laymen recommended that the goods of the monasteries come under the control of a council of elders and that they be used to create schools, but they were opposed by the bishops. Ismail Pasha intervened and designated several people to decide the subject and annulled the election of "undesirable" members, imprisoning the members of the committee that had been charged with going to Constantinople for presenting the subject to the Patriarch. This intervention provoked violent reactions from the Christian population of Crete.

Arkadi
One particular event caused strong reactions among the liberal circles of western Europe, the "Holocaust of Arkadi". The event occurred in November 1866, as a large Ottoman force besieged the Arkadi Monastery, which served as the headquarters of the rebellion. In addition to its 259 defenders, over 700 women and children had taken refuge in the monastery. After a few days of hard fighting, the Ottomans broke into the monastery. At that point, the abbot of the monastery set fire to the gunpowder stored in the monastery's vaults, causing the death of most of the rebels and the women and children sheltered there. As reported by the American writer and consul William Stillman and others over the recently introduced telegraph, this event caused enormous shock in the rest of Europe and in North America and decreased the perceived legitimacy of Ottoman rule.

Context

In the spring of 1866, meetings took place in several villages. On 14 May an assembly was held in the Aghia Kyriaki monastery in Boutsounaria near Chania. They sent a petition to the Sultan and the consuls of the big powers in Chania. At the time of the first meetings of the revolutionary committees, the representatives were elected by province and the representative of the Rethymno region was the hegumen of Arkadi, Gabriel Marinakis.

At the announcement of these nominations Ismail Pasha sent a message to the hegumen via the Bishop of Rethymno, Kallinikos Nikoletakis. The letter demanded that the higumen dissemble the revolutionary assembly or the monastery would be destroyed by Ottoman troops. In the month of July 1866, Ismail Pasha sent his army to capture the insurgents, but the members of the committee fled before his troops arrived. The Ottomans left again after destroying icons and other sacred objects that they found in the monastery.

In September, Ismail Pasha sent the hegumen a new threat of destroying the monastery if the assembly did not yield. The assembly decided to implement a system of defense for the monastery. On 24 September, Panos Koronaios arrived in Crete and landed at Bali. He marched to Arkadi, where he was made commander-in-chief of the revolt for the Rethymno region. A career military man, Koronaios believed that the monastery was not defensible. The hegumen and the monks disagreed and Koronaios conceded to them, but advised the destruction of the stables so that they could not be used by the Ottomans. This plan was ignored. After having named Ioannis Dimakopoulos to the post of commander of the garrison of the monastery, Koronaios left. At his departure, numerous local residents, mostly women and children, took refuge in the monastery, bringing their valuables in hopes of saving them from the Ottomans. By 7 November 1866, the monastery sheltered 964 people: 325 men, of which 259 were armed, the rest women and children.

Arrival of the Ottomans

Since the mid-October victory of Mustafa Pasha's troops at Vafes, the majority of the Ottoman army was stationed in Apokoronas and were particularly concentrated in the fortresses around the bay of Souda. The monastery refused to surrender, so Mustafa Pasha marched his troops on Arkadi. First, he stopped and sacked the village of Episkopi. From Episkopi, Mustafa sent a new letter to the revolutionary committee at Arkadi, ordering them to surrender and informing them that he would arrive at the monastery in the following days. The Ottoman army then turned toward Roustika, where Mustafa spent the night in the monastery of the prophet Elie, while his army camped in the villages of Roustika and Aghios Konstantinos. Mustafa arrived in Rethymno on 5 November, where he met Ottoman and Egyptian reinforcements. The Ottoman troops reached the monastery during the night of 7–8 November. Mustafa, although he had accompanied his troops to a site relatively close, camped with his staff in the village of Messi.

Egyptian Intervention
In late 1866 Isma'il Pasha (Egypt's Khedive) sent an Egyptian Military contingent to aid the Ottoman Empire during the rebellion which was made up of 16,000 infantry troops under the command of Emirliva (major-general) Ismail Shaheen Pasha and where transported and protected by sea by the Egyptian Navy. Due to the ineffectiveness of the Ottoman Navy's siege plan, guns and equipment were easily smuggled to the Cretan rebels from Greece by the sea, which subsequently increased the period of the siege of Cretan capital and unexpected casualties on the Egyptian side. In mid-1867, Khedive Isma'il Pasha removed Shaheen Pasha from the command of the Egyptian forces and replaced him by a more experienced officer, Emirliva Ismail Sadiq Pasha that proved his officership skills and professionality than Shaheen Pasha, where on 6 October 1867 he could successfully defeat the Cretan rebels in their capital.

Attack

On the morning of 8 November, an army of  Ottoman soldiers and 30 cannons, directed by Suleyman, arrived on the hills of the monastery while Mustafa Pasha waited in the Messi. Suleyman, positioned on the hill of Kore to the north of the monastery sent a last request for surrender. He received only gunfire in response.

The assault was begun by the Ottoman forces. Their primary objective was the main door of the monastery on the western face. The battle lasted all day without the Ottomans infiltrating the building. The besieged had barricaded the door and, from the beginning, taking it would be difficult. The Cretans were relatively protected by the walls of the monastery, while the Ottomans, vulnerable to the insurgents' gunfire, suffered numerous losses. Seven Cretans took their position within the windmill of the monastery. This building was quickly captured by the Ottomans, who set it on fire, killing the Cretan warriors inside.

The battle stopped with nightfall. The Ottomans received two heavy cannons from Rethymno, one of which was called Koutsahila. They placed them in the stables. On the side of the insurgents, a war council decided to ask for help from Panos Koronaios and other Cretan leaders in Amari. Two Cretans left by way of the windows by ropes and, disguised as Muslims, crossed the Ottoman lines. The messengers returned later in the night with the news that it was now impossible for reinforcements to arrive in time because all of the access roads had been blocked by the Ottomans.

Combat began again in the evening of 9 November. The cannons destroyed the doors and the Ottomans made it into the building, where they suffered more serious losses. At the same time, the Cretans were running out of ammunition and many among them were forced to battle with only bayonets or other sharp objects. The Ottomans had the advantage.

Destruction

The women and children inside the monastery were hiding in the powder room. The last Cretan fighters were finally defeated and hid within the monastery. Thirty-six insurgents found refuge in the refectory, near the ammunitions. Discovered by the Ottomans, who forced the door, they were massacred.

In the powder room, where the majority of the women and children hid, Konstantinos Giaboudakis gathered the people hiding in the neighbouring rooms together. When the Ottomans arrived at the door of the powder room, Giaboudakis set the barrels of powder on fire and the resulting explosion resulted in the deaths of numerous Ottoman soldiers.

In another room of the monastery holding an equal number of powder barrels, insurgents made the same gesture. But the powder was humid and only exploded partially, so it only destroyed part of the northwest wall of the room.

Of the 964 people present at the start of the assault, 864 were killed in combat or at the moment of the explosion. 114 men and women were captured, but three or four managed to escape, including one of the messengers who had gone for reinforcements. The hegumen Gabriel was among the victims. Tradition holds that he was among those killed by the explosion of the barrels of powder, but it is more likely that he was killed on the first day of combat. Ottoman losses were estimated at 1500. Their bodies were buried without memorials and some were thrown in the neighboring gorges. The remains of numerous Cretan Christians were collected and placed in the windmill, which was made into a reliquary in homage to the defenders of Arkadi. Among the Ottoman troops, a group of Coptic Egyptians were found on the hills outside the monastery. These Christians had refused to kill other Christians. They were executed by the Ottoman troops, and their ammunition cases left behind.

Some 114 survivors were taken prisoner and transported to Rethymno where they were subjected to numerous humiliations from the officers responsible for their transport, but also by the Muslim population who arrived to throw stones and insults when they entered the city. The women and children were imprisoned for a week in the church of the Presentation of the Virgin. The men were imprisoned for a year in difficult conditions. The Russian consulate had to intervene to require Mustafa Pasha to keep basic hygienic conditions and provide clothing to the prisoners. After one year, the prisoners were released.

International reaction
The Ottomans considered taking Arkadi a big victory and celebrated it with cannon fire. However, the events at Arkadi provoked indignation among the Cretans, but also in Greece and abroad. The tragedy of Arkadi turned world opinion on the conflict. The event recalled the Third Siege of Missolonghi and the numerous Philhellenists of the world were in favor of Crete. Volunteers from Serbia, Hungary and Italy arrived on the island. Gustave Flourens, a teacher at the Collège de France, enlisted and arrived in Crete by the end of 1866. He formed a small group of philhellenists with three other Frenchmen, an Englishman, an American, an Italian and a Hungarian. This group published a brochure on The question of the Orient and the Cretan Renaissance, contacted French politicians and organized conferences in France and in Athens. The Cretans named him a deputy at the assembly, but he turned the position down.

Giuseppe Garibaldi, in his letters, praised the patriotism of the Cretans and their wish to gain their independence. Numerous Garibaldians, moved by an ardent philhellenism, came to Crete and participated in several battles. Letters written by Victor Hugo were published in the newspaper Kleio in Trieste, which contributed to the worldwide reaction. The letters gave encouragement to the Cretans and told them that their cause would succeed. He emphasized that the drama of Arkadi was no different than the Destruction of Psara and the Third Siege of Missolonghi. He described the tragedy of Arkadi:

Not finding the necessary solution from the big European powers, the Cretans sought aid from the United States. At this time, the Americans tried to establish a presence in the Mediterranean and showed support for Crete. The relationship grew as they looked for a port in the Mediterranean and they thought, among others, to buy the island of Milo or Port Island. The American public was sympathetic. The American philhellenes arrived to advocate for the idea of Cretan independence, and in 1868, a question of recognition of independent Crete was addressed in the House of Representatives, but it was decided by a vote to follow a policy of non-intervention in Ottoman affairs.

Aftermath of Arkadi
Because the loss of Crete might have been the prelude to a much more serious loss of Ottoman territory in the Balkans, the Ottoman Grand Vizier, Âli Pasha, arrived in the island in October 1867 and remained there for four months. A'ali set in progress a low profile district by district reconquest of the island followed by the construction of blockhouses or local fortresses across the whole of it. These were the basis of continued Ottoman military rule until the final crisis of 1896–1898.

More importantly, he designed an Organic Law which gave the Cretan Christians equal (in practice, because of their superior numbers, majority) control of local administration. He thus gained the minimum of political cooperation needed to retain control of the island by early 1869 and almost all the rebel leaders had submitted to Ottoman rule though some, notably the pro-Russian Hadjimichaelis, remained in exile in Greece.

In fiction
The Cretan revolt is referenced in Jules Verne's novel Twenty Thousand Leagues Under the Sea, written while the revolt was going on. Verne's Captain Nemo is mentioned as using his submarine Nautilus to provide "4,000 lb. weight of gold" to the rebels. This passage clearly indicates the sympathy of Verne to the rebels' cause.

The revolt is mentioned in the novel Freedom and Death by Nikos Kazantzakis. In this work, the explosion of the monastery is attributed to the actions of a relative of the novel's protagonist, Captain Michalis.

Notes

References

Bibliography

 
 
 
 
 
 

Conflicts in 1866
Conflicts in 1867
Conflicts in 1868
Conflicts in 1869
19th-century rebellions
Ottoman Crete
Crete 1866
Greece–Ottoman Empire relations
1866
Jules Verne
1866 in Greece
1867 in Greece
1868 in Greece
1869 in Greece
History of Greece (1863–1909)
1866 in the Ottoman Empire
1867 in the Ottoman Empire
1868 in the Ottoman Empire
1869 in the Ottoman Empire
Rebellions in Greece